Agencja Artystyczna MTJ, is a Polish independent record label founded in 1990 by Tomasz Bujak and Maciej Pluciński.

Although founded in 1990 label started operating in 1995 after signing recording deal with singer Ryszard Rynkowski. In early years company was music warehouse store. In later years label released albums by such artists as Antonina Krzysztoń, Magda Umer, Lady Pank, Stan Borys, Magda Femme and Marian Opania among others. Till 2014 label released over 1500 titles. 
Under various licenses label released also albums by such artists as Jan Bo, Anna Jurksztowicz, Zdzisława Sośnicka, Lech Janerka and Farben Lehre among others.

Labels bestselling artists include Michał Bajor, Sławek Wierzcholski i Nocna Zmiana Bluesa, and Mazowsze among others, with several albums certified Gold and Platinum in Poland.

In 1990s label run a subsidiary Mega Czad witch released rock and heavy metal albums. Other subsidiaries include disco polo oriented Blue Mix and Małe MTJ witch released children's music.

Artists

Current
 
 Agnieszka Babicz
 Andrzej Poniedzielski
 Antonina Krzysztoń
 Atlas Like
 Aurelia Luśnia
 Dorota Osińska
 Felicjan Andrzejczak
 Heroes Get Remembered
 Jakub Pawlak
 Joanna Lewandowska
 Mama Selita
 Magda Femme
 Magda Umer
 Małgorzata Ostrowska
 Michał Bajor
 Olga Bończyk
 Robert Janowski

Former

 Jarosław Wasik
 Lady Pank
 Magda Piskorczyk
 Marian Opania
 Marek Szurawski
 Natalia Sikora
 Ryszard Rynkowski
Sławek Wierzcholski i Nocna Zmiana Bluesa
Stan Borys
Tomasz Szwed
Voo Voo

References

External links
 Official website

Polish independent record labels